Impact Home Video is a division of Impact Wrestling that releases Impact's pay-per-view (PPV) events, documentaries and other Impact produced compilations on physical mediums via ShopImpact.com. Impact Home Video was formed in 2005 originally as TNA Home Video to partner with Navarre Corporation to distribute and produce then-TNA's expanding video library. Early TNA DVDs had no major distributor and were produced and distributed by TNA through their official website. As of 2022, the company no longer has major distribution, mainly due to the downfall of DVDs and physical media, meaning releases are now back to being exclusively through the company's website.

History
Prior to TNA officially forming TNA Home Video, TNA did not have a distribution partner and therefore released six DVDs exclusively on their website. In 2003 TNA released their first three DVDs and in early 2004 TNA released three more DVDs.

TNA originally held weekly pay-per-views from 2002–2004. In 2004 however, TNA changed their format to a weekly free television show known as Impact! as well as monthly three-hour PPVs. Due to this, TNA needed a distribution partner in order to get their PPV events into stores. In 2005 TNA partnered with Navarre Corporation.  This partnership included Navarre releasing TNA's monthly PPV events on DVD as well as multiple compilation DVDs.  The distribution deal with Navarre brought TNA Home Video into major retail stores such as Best Buy and Walmart, in addition to TNA still selling their DVDs on their official website. TNA DVDs were also distributed in the UK via Clear Vision, for a time.

As of 2022, Impact Wrestling only releases product via ShopImpact.com. In 2021, the company began also releasing collectible, limited edition, VHS tapes of events.

Pay-per-view releases
2004
 Victory Road 2004
 Turning Point 2004
2005
 Final Resolution 2005
 Against All Odds 2005
 Destination X 2005
 Lockdown 2005
 Hard Justice 2005
 Slammiversary 2005
 No Surrender 2005
 Sacrifice 2005
 Unbreakable 2005
 Bound for Glory 2005
 Genesis 2005
 Turning Point 2005
2006
 Final Resolution 2006
 Against All Odds 2006
 Destination X 2006
 Lockdown 2006
 Sacrifice 2006
 Slammiversary 2006
 Victory Road 2006
 Hard Justice 2006
 No Surrender 2006
 Bound for Glory 2006
 Genesis 2006
 Turning Point 2006
2007
 Final Resolution 2007
 Against All Odds 2007
 Destination X 2007
 Lockdown 2007
 Sacrifice 2007
 Slammiversary 2007
 Victory Road 2007
 Hard Justice 2007
 No Surrender 2007
 Bound for Glory 2007
 Genesis 2007
 Turning Point 2007
2008
 Final Resolution 2008
 Against All Odds 2008
 Destination X 2008
 Lockdown 2008
 Sacrifice 2008
 Slammiversary 2008
 Victory Road 2008
 Hard Justice 2008
 No Surrender 2008
 Bound for Glory IV
 Turning Point 2008
 Final Resolution 2008
2009
 Genesis 2009
 Against All Odds 2009
 Destination X 2009
 Lockdown 2009
 Sacrifice 2009
 Slammiversary 2009
 Victory Road 2009
 Hard Justice 2009
 No Surrender 2009
 Bound for Glory 2009
 Turning Point 2009
 Final Resolution 2009
2010
 Genesis 2010
 Against All Odds 2010
 Destination X 2010
 Lockdown 2010
 Sacrifice 2010
 Slammiversary 2010
 Victory Road 2010
 Hardcore Justice 2010
 No Surrender 2010
 Bound for Glory 2010
 Turning Point 2010
 Final Resolution 2010
2011
 Genesis 2011
 Against All Odds 2011
 Victory Road 2011
 Lockdown 2011
 Sacrifice 2011
 Slammiversary IX
 Destination X 2011
 Hardcore Justice 2011
 No Surrender 2011
 Bound for Glory 2011
 Turning Point 2011
 Final Resolution 2011
2012
 Genesis 2012
 Against All Odds 2012
 Victory Road 2012
 Lockdown 2012
 Sacrifice 2012
 Slammiversary 2012
 Destination X 2012
 Hardcore Justice 2012
 No Surrender 2012
 Bound for Glory 2012
 Turning Point 2012
 Final Resolution 2012
2013
 Genesis 2013
 Lockdown 2013
 One Night Only: X-Travaganza
 One Night Only: Joker's Wild
 Slammiversary XI
 One Night Only: Hardcore Justice 2
 One Night Only: 10 Reunion
 One Night Only: Knockouts Knockdown
 Bound for Glory 2013
 One Night Only: Tournament of Champions
 One Night Only: World Cup of Wrestling
2014
 One Night Only: Tag Team Tournament
 One Night Only: #OLDSCHOOL
 Sacrifice 2014
 One Night Only: Joker's Wild 2
 Slammiversary 2014
 One Night Only: Global Impact Japan
 One Night Only: X-Travaganza 2014
 One Night Only: World Cup 2014
 Bound for Glory 2014
 One Night Only: Knockouts Knockdown 2014
 One Night Only: Victory Road
2015
 One Night Only: Turning Point
 One Night Only: Rivals
 One Night Only: Joker's Wild 2015
 One Night Only: Hardcore Justice 2015
 One Night Only: X-Travaganza 2015
 Slammiversary 2015
 One Night Only: World Cup 2015
 One Night Only: Gut Check
 Bound for Glory 2015
 One Night Only: USA vs. The World
2016
 One Night Only: Live! 2016
 One Night Only: Rivals 2016
 One Night Only: Joker's Wild 2016
 One Night Only: Knockouts Knockdown 2016
 One Night Only: Victory Road 2016
 Slammiversary 2016
 One Night Only: World Cup 2016

2017
 One Night Only: Joker's Wild 2017
 One Night Only: Rivals 2017
 One Night Only: Victory Road – Knockouts Knockdown
Slammiversary (2017)
 One Night Only: Turning Point 2017
Bound for Glory (2017)
 One Night Only: No Surrender 2017

2018

 Redemption
 Slammiversary
 Bound for Glory

2019

 Homecoming
2020

 Slammiversary (2020)
 Bound for Glory (2020)

2021

 Hard To Kill (2021)
 Rebellion (2021)
 Slammiversary (2021)
 Bound for Glory (2021) [DVD/VHS]

2022

 Hard To Kill (2022)
 Rebellion (2022)
 Slammiversary (2022)

Compilation releases

2003
Best of NWA-TNA Title Matches
Best of X-Division Matches
Best of Bloodiest Brawls
2004
The Ultimate X Collection
The Best of America's Most Wanted
The Best of 3Live Kru
2005
 10/04/05 - The Best of Raven: Nevermore
 10/04/05 - The Best of Jeff Hardy: Enigma
 10/04/05 - The Best of A.J. Styles: Phenomenal
 10/04/05 - The Best of the X Division Vol. 1
2006
 01/10/06 - The Best of Christopher Daniels: Heaven Sent, Hell Bound
 03/14/06 - The Best of the Bloodiest Brawls Vol. 1
 06/06/06 - The Best of Samoa Joe: Unstoppable
 08/29/06 - Knockouts: The Ladies Of TNA Wrestling Vol. 1
 10/10/06 - Sting: Return of an Icon
 10/31/06 - Best Of the X Division Vol. 2
 11/21/06 - The 50 Greatest Moments
2007
 03/13/07 - Best of the Tag Teams Vol. 1
 04/10/07 - Phenomenal: The Best of A.J. Styles Vol. 2
 07/31/07 - Doomsday: The Best of Abyss
 10/23/07 - Christian Cage: The Instant Classic
 11/20/07 - The History of TNA: Year 1
2008
 04/22/08 - Best of TNA 2007
 06/24/08 - Global Impact: Japan
 08/05/08 - Best of The Bloodiest Brawls: Scars and Stitches
 10/07/08 - Knocked Out: Pro Wrestling's Best Women's Division
 10/21/08 - Ultimate Matches
 11/25/08 - Kurt Angle: Champion
2009
 04/14/09 - Jeff Jarrett: King of the Mountain
 04/14/09 - World X-Cup 2008
 05/05/09 - Second 2 None: TNA's Toughest Tag Teams
2010
 02/16/10 - Best of TNA 2009
 05/25/10 - Fandimonium: Beer Money, Inc. & Motor City Machine Guns
 09/21/10 - Best of Asylum Years Vol. 1
 10/19/10 - Wrestling's Greatest Moments
2011
 04/19/11 - The Best of Mick Foley
 07/19/11 - Immortal Forever?
 10/18/11 - Enigma: The Best of Jeff Hardy Vol. 2
2016
 05/1/16 - Best of the Asylum Years Vol. 2

Box sets
 Best of the X Division Vol. 1 & Vol. 2 (Twin Pack)
 TNA Anthology: The Epic Set (Victory Road 2004, Turning Point 2004 & Lockdown 2005)
 TNA: Triple Threat (Hard Justice 2005, Slammiversary 2005 & No Surrender 2005)
 Cross the Line Vol. 1 (Victory Road 2008, Hard Justice 2008 & No Surrender 2008)
 Cross the Line Vol. 2 (Turning Point 2008, Final Resolution 2008 & Genesis 2009)
 Cross the Line Vol. 3 (Turning Point 2009, Final Resolution 2009 & Against All Odds 2010)
 Victory Road 2010 & No Surrender 2010 (Twin Pack Vol. 1)
 Turning Point 2010 & Final Resolution 2010 (Twin Pack Vol. 2)
 Against All Odds 2011 & Victory Road 2011 (Twin Pack Vol. 3)
 Sacrifice 2011 & Slammiversary 2011 (Twin Pack Vol. 4)
 Hardcore Justice 2011 & No Surrender 2011 (Twin Pack Vol. 5)
 Turning Point 2011 & Final Resolution 2011 (Twin Pack Vol. 6)
 Against All Odds 2012 & Victory Road 2012 (Twin Pack Vol. 7)

See also
WWE Home Video

References

Impact Wrestling television shows
Mass media companies established in 2003
2003 establishments in Tennessee
Home video distributors